The 1892 Birthday Honours were appointments by Queen Victoria to various orders and honours to reward and highlight good works by citizens of the British Empire. The appointments were made to celebrate the official birthday of The Queen, and were published in the London Gazette on 24 May 1892 and in The Times on 25 May 1892.

The recipients of honours are displayed here as they were styled before their new honour, and arranged by honour, with classes (Knight, Knight Grand Cross, etc.) and then divisions (Military, Civil, etc.) as appropriate.

United Kingdom and British Empire

Baron
The Right Hon. Sir Henry Selwin-Ibbetson 
Sir Evelyn Baring  Her Majesty's Agent and Consul-General at Cairo.

Privy Councillor
The Queen appointed the following to Her Majesty's Most Honourable Privy Council:
Alexander Bruce, Lord Balfour of Burleigh.

Baronetcies
Francis Sharp Powell 
Henry Wiggin

Knight Bachelor
Frederick Bateman 
William James Bell 
William James Richmond Cotton, City Remembrancer.
John Gardner Engleheart  Clerk of the Council of the Duchy of Lancaster.
George Findlay, General Manager of the London and North Western Railway.
George Johnson  Physician Extraordinary to her Majesty.
Robert Micks, Secretary of the Excise Department, Inland Revenue Board.
Joseph Palmer Abbott, Speaker of the Legislative Assembly of New South Wales.
Alexandre Lacoste, Chief Justice of the Queen's Bench, Quebec.
George Clarke Pill, President of the Legislative Council of the Island of Barbados.

The Most Honourable Order of the Bath

Knight Grand Cross of the Order of the Bath (KGCB)

Military Division
Admiral Sir George Ommanney Willes 

Civil Division
Sir Julian Pauncefote  Her Majesty's Envoy Extraordinary and Minister Plenipotentiary to the United States.

Knight Commander of the Order of the Bath (KCB)
Military Division
Vice-Admiral John Ommanney Hopkins.
Vice-Admiral Algernon Charles Fieschi Heneage.
General John William Collman Williams, Royal Marine Artillery.

Civil Division
Godfrey Lushington  Under Secretary of State, Home Office.
Lieutenant-General Richard Hieram Sankey   (Military Division), Chairman Board of Public Works, Ireland.
Henry Jenkyns  Parliamentary Counsel.
Courtenay Boyle  Assistant Secretary, Board of Trade (Railway Department).
Lieutenant-Colonel George Archibald Leach  late Royal Engineers, late Secretary to the Board of Agriculture.
Admiral William Windham Hornby, Commissioner, Prison Department, Home Office.
John Evans  President of the Society of Antiquaries.

Companion of the Order of the Bath (CB)
Military Division
Capt. Uvedale Corbet Singleton 
Capt. Rodney Maclaine Lloyd 
Capt. Tynte Ford Hammill 
Capt. Sir William Cecil Henry Domville  
Capt. Reginald Friend Hannam Henderson 
Capt. Henry John May 
Commander Robert Archibald James Montgomerie 
Colonel Arthur French  Royal Marine Artillery.
Lieutenant-Colonel William Guise Tucker, Royal Marine Artillery.
Fleet Surgeon Edward Elphinstone Mahon 
William Castle  Chief Inspector of Machinery 

Civil Division
James Caulfeild, Viscount Charlemont, late Comptroller of the Household to the Viceroy of Ireland.
George Culley, Commissioner of Her Majesty's Woods and Forests.
Joseph Brown  Chairman of the Incorporated Council of Law Reporting.
William Patrick O'Brien, General Prisons Board, Ireland.
Henry Nicol, late Superintendent, Treasury County Court Department.
Charles S. Murdoch, Home Office.
William Clayton Pickersgill, Her Majesty's Vice-Consul in Madagascar.
Louis Brennan, Superintendent of the Brennan Torpedo Factory.

The Most Exalted Order of the Star of India

Knight Grand Commander (GCSI)
Colonel His Highness Maharaja Pratap Singh, Indar Mahindar Bahadur, Sipar-i-Sultanat of Jammu and Kashmir.

Knight Commander (KCSI)
Sir Auckland Colvin  Bengal Civil Service, Lieutenant Governor of the North-Western Provinces and Chief Commissioner of Oudh.
Henry Edward Stokes  Madras Civil Service, Member of the Council of the Governor of Madras.
His Excellency Maharaja Bir Shumsher Jang Bahadur Rana, Prime Minister of Nepal. 
Maharaja Mana Vikrama Bahadur Zamorin of Calicut.

Companion (CSI)
Sir Edward Charles Buck, Bengal Civil Service, Secretary to Government of India, Revenue and Agriculture Department.
Henry John Stedman Cotton, Bengal Civil Service, Officiating Secretary to the Government of Bengal, Member of the Legislative Council of Bengal.
Surgeon-Major-General William Roche Rice  Indian Medical Service, Surgeon-General and Sanitary Commissioner with Government of India.
Colonel Frederick Jervis Home, Royal Engineers, Inspector-General of Irrigation and Deputy Secretary to the Government of India, Public Works Department.
Major Henry St. Patrick Maxwell, Indian Staff Corps, Deputy Commissioner, Assam, and Political Agent and Superintendent of the Manipur State.
Surgeon-Major George Scott Robertson, Bengal Establishment, Agency Surgeon, Gilgit.

The Most Distinguished Order of Saint Michael and Saint George

Knight Grand Cross of the Order of St Michael and St George (GCMG)
Major-General Sir Francis Wallace Grenfell  for services rendered in Egypt.
Sir Horace Rumbold  Her Majesty's Envoy Extraordinary and Minister Plenipotentiary at the Hague.

Knight Commander of the Order of St Michael and St George (KCMG)
John Joseph Caldwell Abbott  Prime Minister of the Dominion of Canada and President of the Queen's Privy Council for the Dominion.
Chaloner Alabaster, Her Majesty's Consul-General at Canton.
Patrick Alphonsus Buckley, Attorney-General and Colonial Secretary of the Colony of New Zealand.
Ferdinando Vincenzo Inglott  late Postmaster-General of the Island of Malta.
Oliver Mowat  Attorney-General and Premier of the Province of Ontario in the Dominion of Canada.
Sir William Montagu Manning  Member of the Legislative Council of the Colony of New South Wales.
Elwin Mitford Palmer  for services rendered in Egypt.
Sir David Tennant  Speaker of the House of Assembly of the Colony of the Cape of Good Hope.

Companion of the Order of St Michael and St George (CMG)
Alfred Edmund Bateman, of the Board of Trade, for services in connection with British Commercial interests abroad.
Lewis Adolphus Bernays, Clerk of the Legislative Assembly of the Colony of Queensland.
George Mercer Dawson  Assistant Director and Geologist of the Geological and Natural History Survey of the Dominion of Canada, one of Her Majesty's Commissioners on the Behring's Sea Fishery.
Robert William Span Mitchell, Government Emigration Agent in Calcutta for the Colonies of British Guiana and Natal.
Morice Pasha, for services rendered in Egypt.
Joseph Henry Phillips, Senior Unofficial Member of the Executive Council of the Colony of British Honduras.
Thomas Shelford, an Unofficial Member of the Legislative Council of the Straits Settlements.
Walter Ernest Mortimer Stanford, Chief Magistrate of Griqualand East, in the Colony of the Cape of Good Hope.
James Alexander Swettenham, Auditor-General and Member of the Executive and Legislative Councils of the Island of Ceylon.
Everard Ferdinand im Thurn  Government Agent of the North-Western District of the Colony of British Guiana.
Francis Pratt Winter, Chief Judicial Officer and Member of the Executive and Legislative Councils of the Possession of British New Guinea.

The Most Eminent Order of the Indian Empire

Knight Grand Commander (GCIE)
Sir James Broadwood Lyall  Bengal Civil Service, late Lieutenant-Governor of the Punjab.
Maharaja Mirza Sir Pusapati Ananda Gajapati Raju  Mani Sultan Bahadur Garu Zamindar of Vizianagram

Knight Commander (KCIE)
Thiruvarur Muthuswamy Iyer  one of the Puisne Judges, High Court of Judicature, Madras.
Griffith Humphrey Pugh Evans,  Additional Member of the Council of the Viceroy of India for making Laws and Regulations.
Edward Charles Kayll Ollivant  Bombay Civil Service, Political Agent and Collector of Stamp Revenue, Kathiawar.
Charles Pontifex, late Legal Adviser and Solicitor to the Secretary of State for India.
Henry Hoyle Howorth 
Henry Seymour King

Companion (CIE)
Lieutenant-Colonel John Walter Ottley, Royal Engineers, Chief Engineer and Joint Secretary to the Government of the Punjab.
Frederick Ewart Robertson, Chief Engineer of the East India Railway.
Romesh Chunder Dutt, Bengal Civil Service.
Arthur John Hughes, Superintending Engineer, North Western Provinces and Oudh.
William John Bird Clerke, Civil Engineer
Loudoun Francis MacLean, Civil Engineer
Lieutenant Hugh Daly, Indian Staff Corps, Superintendent, Northern Shan States.
James George Scott, Officiating Superintendent of the Northern Shan States.
George Pringle Rose, Officiating Deputy Manager, North Western Railway.
Raj Bahadur Jai Prakash Lal, Diwan of the Maharaja of Dumraon.
Raj Bahadur Kadir Dad Khan, Gul Khan, Deputy Collector, Sind.
Diwan Ganpat Rai, Extra Assistant-Commissioner, Baluchistan.
William Turner Thiselton-Dyer  Director of the Royal Botanic Gardens, Kew.

References

Birthday Honours
1892 awards
1892 in Australia
1892 in Canada
1892 in India
1892 in the United Kingdom